Juozas Gabrys or Juozas Gabrys-Paršaitis (February 22, 1880 – July 26, 1951) was a Lithuanian politician and diplomat, best remembered for his efforts to popularize the idea of Lithuania's independence in the West during World War I.

Early life 
Juozas Gabrys was born on February 22, 1880, in the town of Garliava, near the city of Kaunas, Lithuania. He went to the Garliava primary school starting at the age of seven. He graduated with a law degree from the University of Odessa in 1907.

Biography 
Gabrys was a secretary of the Great Seimas of Vilnius during the 1905 Russian Revolution. He went into exile in 1907 to Paris. There, in 1911, he founded the Lithuanian Information Bureau. In 1912, he founded the Union des Nationalités. These two organizations supplied European powers with information on Lithuania and other exploited European countries that crusaded for human rights and freedom. In 1915, Gabrys moved from Paris to Lausanne, Switzerland. He started a campaign of political activities and held the first Lithuanian conferences during World War I to obtain freedom for Lithuania. His campaigns were financed by Lithuanian immigrants of the United States and the German Foreign Ministry. He published articles in more than fifty European newspapers for his campaigns, sometimes bribing editors to get them through. His greatest success in organization was the Congress of Nationalities held in Switzerland in 1916 with 400 representatives from 23 nationalities.

According to Alfred E. Senn, "Gabrys was undoubtedly the best known Lithuanian political figure on the European scene before 1916." During the time period of World War I, Gabrys hoped to secure independence for Lithuania. He communicated the cruel treatment the Lithuanians were receiving from the German military when they were occupying Lithuania to the French authorities. He also called upon the Allies of World War I for assisting against German occupation. Gabrys involved the Vatican in a worldwide collection of millions of Swiss francs for Lithuanian victims of war, which ultimately ended up in his personal bank accounts. He labelled himself "Count of Garlawa" in his memoirs. When the new Lithuanian government started at the end of 1918, Gabrys was not a political participant because of his disagreements with the government officials. Because of his German government contacts during World War I, he ultimately "became virtually an unperson" in Lithuanian history despite his efforts to liberate the country.

Later life 
In 1919, with the help of the French, Gabrys unsuccessfully attempted to get a Lithuanian government position. From that point on, he dabbled in Lithuanian politics until he retired.  In retirement, he became a gentleman-farmer in Switzerland. Gabrys died on 26 July 1951 at Corsier-sur-Vevey in Switzerland.

Works 
Gabrys is the only leading Lithuanian liberation political advocate during World War I to write his memoirs in a Western language. His works include:

References

Bibliography

External links
 

1880 births
1951 deaths
Lithuanian politicians
Lithuanian expatriates in Switzerland
Odesa University alumni
People from Garliava
Lithuanian consuls